Saline County (standard abbreviation: SA) is located in the U.S. state of Kansas. As of the 2020 census, the county population was 54,303. The largest city and county seat is Salina.

History

Early history

For many millennia, the Great Plains of North America was inhabited by nomadic Native Americans. From the 16th century to 18th century, the Kingdom of France claimed ownership of large parts of North America. In 1762, after the French and Indian War, France secretly ceded New France to Spain, per the Treaty of Fontainebleau. In 1802, Spain returned most of the land to France, but keeping title to about 7,500 square miles.

In 1803, most of the land for modern day Kansas was acquired by the United States from France as part of the 828,000 square mile Louisiana Purchase for 2.83 cents per [cre. In 1848, after the Mexican–American War, the Treaty of Guadalupe Hidalgo with Spain brought into the United States all or part of land for ten future states, including southwest Kansas. In 1854, the Kansas Territory was organized, then in 1861 Kansas became the 34th U.S. state.

19th century
In 1860, Saline County was founded.

20th century
Saline County was a prohibition, or "dry", county until the Kansas Constitution was amended in 1986 and voters approved the sale of alcoholic liquor by the individual drink with a 30% food sales requirement.  The food sales requirement was removed with voter approval in 1994.

Geography

Adjacent counties
 Ottawa County (north)
 Dickinson County (east)
 Marion County (southeast)
 McPherson County (south)
 Ellsworth County (west)
 Lincoln County (northwest)

Demographics

Saline County is part of the Salina Micropolitan Statistical Area.

2000 census
As of the census of 2000, there were 53,597 people, 21,436 households, and 14,212 families residing in the county. The racial makeup of the county was 89.17% White, 3.10% Black or African American, 0.52% Native American, 1.70% Asian, 0.04% Pacific Islander, 3.33% from other races, and 2.14% from two or more races.  6.02% of the population were Hispanic or Latino of any race.

There were 21,436 households in the county, out of which 32.10% had children under the age of 18 living with them, 52.90% were married couples living together, 9.70% had a female householder with no husband present, and 33.70% were non-families. 28.30% of all households were made up of individuals, and 10.70% had someone living alone who was 65 years of age or older.  The average household size was 2.43 and the average family size was 2.98.

In the county, the population was spread out, with 26.20% under the age of 18, 9.40% from 18 to 24, 28.40% from 25 to 44, 22.10% from 45 to 64, and 14.00% who were 65 years of age or older.  The median age was 36 years. For every 100 females, there were 97.40 males.  For every 100 females age 18 and over, there were 94.40 males.

The median income for a household in the county was $37,308, and the median income for a family was $46,362. Males had a median income of $31,509 versus $22,047 for females. The per capita income for the county was $19,073.  About 6.00% of families and 8.80% of the population were below the poverty line, including 9.60% of those under age 18 and 8.80% of those age 65 or over.

Government

Board of Commissioners
Saline County is governed by a Board of Commissioners. The commission enacts the annual budget for the county, currently set at about $38,000,000, creates policy to be implemented by the county administrator, approves contracts, and oversees legislation relating to the health, safety, and well-being of the county's citizens.

The Board of Commissioners has three members, one elected from each of the three commission districts. Commissioners are elected on a partisan basis. The districts are reapportioned every three years, with the three districts being equally populated. Term lengths are four years.

Current representatives on the Board of Commissioners are John Price (District 3; vice chairman), Monte Shadwick (District 1; secretary), and Jim Gile (District 2; chairman).
In 2014, citizens voted to change the number of commissioners from three to five. The group, “Drive for Five”, successfully campaigned for better representation of the people. Monte Shadwick defeated incumbent commissioner Randy Duncan, who finished last in a three-way race.

Governor Sam Brownback was tasked with appointing the two new commission members that will serve for two years and then be up for election by the people. On January 12, 2015, Luci Larson and Dave Smith were appointed to the newly created 4th and 5th Districts.

County administrator
The county administrator is hired by the Board of Commissioners and is the administrative officer for the county. The administrator is responsible for researching administrative and operational issues and then presenting suggestions for improvement in government efficiency to the Board of Commissioners and for reviewing all requests for action brought to the Board of Commissioners. The county administrator also implements policies enacted by the Board of Commissioners, prepares the annual budget, and "supervises accounts payable, payroll, human resource division and central purchasing for the county." As needed, the county administrator will represent the county on boards and commissions.

The current county administrator is Andrew Manley.

Presidential elections

Saline County is a Republican stronghold: the last Democrat to win a majority in the county was Lyndon Johnson in 1964, who was also the last Democrat to carry the state's electoral votes. Saline has voted for the statewide winner in every presidential election since 1872, including for James Weaver in 1892.

Laws
The county voted "No" on the 2022 Kansas Value Them Both Amendment, an anti-abortion ballot measure, by 55% to 45% despite backing Donald Trump with 64% of the vote to Joe Biden's 33% in the 2020 presidential election.

Education

Colleges and universities
 Kansas State University Polytechnic Campus in Salina
 Kansas Wesleyan University in Salina
 Salina Area Technical College in Salina

Unified school districts
 Salina USD 305
 Southeast of Saline USD 306
 Ell-Saline USD 307

School district office in neighboring county
 Twin Valley USD 240
 Solomon USD 393 
 Smoky Valley USD 400

Private schools
 St. John's Military School
 Sacred Heart High School

Communities

Cities

 Assaria
 Brookville
 Gypsum
 New Cambria
 Salina
 Smolan
 Solomon (partly in Dickinson County)

Unincorporated communities
† means a Census-Designated Place (CDP) by the United States Census Bureau.

 Bavaria†
 Bridgeport†
 Falun†
 Glendale
 Hedville
 Kipp†
 Mentor†
 Salemsborg
 Shipton
 Trenton

Townships
Saline County is divided into eighteen townships.  The city of Salina is considered governmentally independent and is excluded from the census figures for the townships.  In the following table, the population center is the largest city (or cities) included in that township's population total, if it is of a significant size.

See also

 National Register of Historic Places listings in Saline County, Kansas
 Rolling Hills Zoo

References

Further reading

 Portrait and Biographical Record of Dickinson, Saline, McPherson, and Marion Counties, Kansas; Chapman Bros; 614 pages; 1893.
 Standard Atlas of Saline County, Kansas; Geo. A. Ogle & Co; 71 pages; 1920.
 Plat Book of Saline County, Kansas; North West Publishing Co; 40 pages; 1903.
 Edwards' Atlas of Saline County, Kansas; John P. Edwards; 42 pages; 1884.

External links

County
 
 Saline County - Directory of Public Officials
Maps
 Saline County Maps: Current, Historic, KDOT
 Kansas Highway Maps: Current, Historic, KDOT
 Kansas Railroad Maps: Current, 1996, 1915, KDOT and Kansas Historical Society

 
Kansas counties
1860 establishments in Kansas Territory
Salina, Kansas micropolitan area
Populated places established in 1860